Christiane Pape née Weninger (born 12 December 1960) is a former German para table tennis player who has won fifteen medals in European championships, seven medals in world championships and was one of the first athletes to win medals for reunified Germany in 1992.

References

1960 births
Living people
Sportspeople from Nuremberg
Paralympic table tennis players of Germany
Medalists at the 1992 Summer Paralympics
Medalists at the 1996 Summer Paralympics
Medalists at the 2000 Summer Paralympics
Table tennis players at the 1992 Summer Paralympics
Table tennis players at the 1996 Summer Paralympics
Table tennis players at the 2000 Summer Paralympics
Table tennis players at the 2004 Summer Paralympics
Medalists at the 2004 Summer Paralympics
Paralympic medalists in table tennis
Paralympic gold medalists for Germany
Paralympic silver medalists for Germany
Paralympic bronze medalists for Germany
German female table tennis players
20th-century German women
21st-century German women